A high-income economy is defined by the World Bank as a nation with a gross national income per capita of US$13,589 or more in 2022, calculated using the Atlas method. While the term "high-income" is often used interchangeably with "First World" and "developed country," the technical definitions of these terms differ. The term "first world" commonly refers to countries that aligned themselves with the U.S. and NATO during the Cold War. Several institutions, such as the Central Intelligence Agency (CIA) or International Monetary Fund (IMF), take factors other than high per capita income into account when classifying countries as "developed" or "advanced economies." According to the United Nations, for example, some high-income countries may also be developing countries. The GCC countries, for example, are classified as developing high-income countries. Thus, a high-income country may be classified as either developed or developing. Although the Vatican City is a sovereign state, it is not classified by the World Bank under this definition.

List of high-income economies (as of 2023 fiscal year)
According to the World Bank the following 82 countries (including territories) are classified as "high-income economies." In brackets are the year(s) during which they held such classification; classifying began in 1987.
As of the 2023 fiscal year, high-income economies are those that had a GNI per capita of $13,205 or more in 2021.

High income UN members

  (1990–present)
  (2002, 2005–08, 2012–present)
  (1987–present)
  (1987–present)
  (1987–present)
  (1987–89, 2001–present)
  (1989, 2000, 2002, 2006–present)
  (1987–present)
  (1987, 1990–present)
  (1987–present)
  (2012–present)
  (2008–2015, 2017–present)
  (1988–present)
  (2006–present)
  (1987–present)
  (2006–present)
  (1987–present)
  (1987–present)
  (1987–present)
  (1996–present)
  (2007–11, 2014–present)
  (1987–present)
  (1987–present)
  (1987–present)
  (1987–present)
  (1987–present)
  (1993–97, 1999–present)
  (1987–present)
  (2009, 2012–present)
  (1994–present)
  (2012–present)
  (1987–present)
  (1989, 1998, 2000, 2002–present)
  (1994–present)
  (2015, 2019–present)
  (1987–present)
  (1987–present)
  (1987–present)
  (2007–present)
  (2017–2019, 2021–present)
  (2009–present)
  (1994–present)
  (2019, 2021–present)
  (1987–present)
  (2012–present)
  (1991–93, 2000–present)
  (1987–89, 2003–present)
  (2014–present)
  (1987–present)
  (2007–present)
  (1997–present)
  (1987–present)
  (1987–present)
  (1987–present)
  (2006–present)
  (1987–present)
  (1987–present)
  (1987–present)
  (2012–present)

High income non-UN members

  (1987–present)
  (1987–present)
  (2015–present)
  (1993–present)
  /  Channel Islands (1987–present)
  (2016–present)
  (1994–present)a
  (1987–present)
  (1990–present)
  (2009–10, 2015–present)
  (1987–present)
  (1987–89, 1995–present)
  (1987–present)
  (1987–89, 2002–present)
  (1994–present)
  (1995–present)
  (1995–2001, 2007–present)
  (1989, 2002–present)
  (2010–present)
  (1994–present)a
  (1988–present)
  (2009–present)
  (1987–present)

Former high-income economies
The year(s) during which they held such classification is/are shown in parenthesis.

  (2013, 2015, 2017)
  (1987–89)
  (2007–14)
  (2019)
  (1994–2009)b
  (2016–20)
  (2012–14)
  (2014)

b Dissolved on 10 October 2010. Succeeded by Curaçao and Sint Maarten.

Historical thresholds

The high-income threshold was originally set in 1989 at US$6,000 in 1987 prices. Thresholds for subsequent years were adjusted taking into account the average inflation in the G-5 countries (the United States, the United Kingdom, Japan, Germany, and France), and from 2001, that of Japan, the United Kingdom, the United States, and the eurozone. Thus, the thresholds remain constant in real terms over time. To ensure no country falls right on the threshold, country data are rounded to the nearest 10 and income thresholds are rounded to the nearest 5.

The following table shows the high-income threshold from 1987 onwards. Countries with a GNI per capita (calculated using the Atlas method) above this threshold are classified by the World Bank as "high-income economies."

See also

 High-income OECD country
 Developed country
 Developing country
 Least developed countries
 Global North and Global South

References

Economic country classifications
Politics by region